Always and Forever is the sixth studio album by Silk. It was released by Shanachie Records on October 17, 2006 in the United States. The album includes covers tracks like Switch's "There'll Never Be", The System's "Don't Disturb This Groove" and Shalamar's "A Night to Remember," and traditional R&B productions of Prince's "Adore", and Rod Temperton's "Secret Garden (Sweet Seduction Suite)."

Critical reception

AllMusic editor Jonathan Widran rated the album four out of five stars. He noted that "keeping the spotlight on those million dollar harmonies, Silk pays its best homage when mixing contemporary funk rhythms with creative harmonic mixtures (including cool vocal percussion textures) [...] but they're also dynamite on traditional R&B productions [...] This exciting disc isn't about making a comeback, it's about showing love for the music that inspired Silk's heyday in the first place."

Track listing

Charts

Release history

References

Silk (group) albums
2006 albums
Shanachie Records albums